Joseph Franz Hedwig Loeckx (4 May 1937 – 7 February 2023) was a Belgian comic book artist. He worked under the pseudonym of Jo-El Azara. Important series he worked on include Clifton  and Taka Takata.

Biography
Loeckx was born in Drogenbos, Flemish Brabant, near Brussels, Belgium, on 4 May 1937.

Loeckx is sometimes referred to as Joseph-R. Loeckx in error. During his working life, first he used the penname of Jo-El, subsequently Ernest, and thereafter worked as Jo-El Azara, under which name he has drawn most of his comics.

A long career of working with the great names in Belgian and French comics, including Hergé, Macherot, and Uderzo, he was active in publishing his own Taka-Takata albums under his Azéko label.

Loeckx lived in the south of France, close to the Pyrenees. His lifelong partner, Josette Baujot, died on 13 August 2009. He died on 7 February 2023, at the age of 85.

References

External links
 Taka Takata official site
 Jo-El Azara biography on Lambiek Comiclopedia

1937 births
2023 deaths
Belgian comics artists
Belgian comics writers
People from Drogenbos